Kalifornien may be:

 the German and Swedish name of California
 a district of Schönberg (Holstein)